Bernadette N. Setiadi (26 October 1948) is a social psychologist of Indonesia. She has written on the Indonesian family and other issues.

References 

Indonesian people of Chinese descent
Indonesian women writers
1948 births
Living people